Beck Barns and Automobile Storage, on Center St. in Paris, Idaho, was listed on the National Register of Historic Places in 1982.  The listing included four contributing buildings.

The listed complex consists of a former automobile storage building, an automobile garage, and two barns.  A corral surrounds the two barns, one of which dates from c.1880.

References

National Register of Historic Places in Bear Lake County, Idaho
Buildings and structures completed in 1880